This was the first edition of the event.

Gilles Müller won the title, defeating Tatsuma Ito in the final, 7–6(7–5), 5–7, 6–4.

Seeds

  Lukáš Lacko (semifinals)
  Rajeev Ram (quarterfinals)
  Go Soeda (second round)
  Samuel Groth (quarterfinals)
  Tatsuma Ito (final)
  Yūichi Sugita (semifinals, retired right ankle injury)
  Gilles Müller (champion)
  Hiroki Moriya (first round)

Draw

Finals

Top half

Bottom half

References
 Main Draw
 Qualifying Draw

Adidas International Gimcheon - Singles
2014 Singles